Nikita Aleksandrovich Chernov (born 14 January 1996) is a Russian professional football player who plays as a centre-back for Spartak Moscow and Russia national football team.

Club career
Born in Volzhsky, Volgograd Oblast, Chernov began his career at hometown team FC Energiya Volzhsky before joining CSKA Moscow in 2009. He made his professional debut on 24 September 2014 in a Russian Cup game against FC Khimik Dzerzhinsk. He also played in the next Russian Cup round against FC Torpedo Moscow on 29 October.

On 30 July 2019, Chernov moved from CSKA Moscow to Krylia Sovetov Samara, where he played for two-and-a-half seasons.

On 4 February 2022, Chernov signed a 4-year contract with FC Spartak Moscow beginning in the summer of 2022. On 22 February 2022, Spartak and Krylia Sovetov agreed to make the transfer immediate instead. Chernov scored his first goal for Spartak on 23 November 2022 in a 1-2 cup defeat against Krylia Sovetov Samara.

International
He participated in the 2013 FIFA U-17 World Cup with Russia national under-17 football team.

On 30 May 2015, Chernov made his first senior appearance in the national team in a friendly against Belarus before he played a single game in the domestic league. Later on, he replaced Vasili Berezutski early in a European qualifier against Austria.

In July 2015, Chernov was part of the Russian under-19 team which came runners-up to Spain at the European Championship in Greece; he scored twice in a 4–1 semi-final victory over the hosts at the AEL FC Arena in Larissa.

Career statistics

Club

Notes

Honours
CSKA Moscow
Russian Super Cup: 2018.

Spartak Moscow
Russian Cup: 2021–22

External links

References

1996 births
People from Volzhsky, Volgograd Oblast
Sportspeople from Volgograd Oblast
Living people
Association football defenders
Russian footballers
Russia youth international footballers
Russia under-21 international footballers
Russia international footballers
PFC CSKA Moscow players
FC Baltika Kaliningrad players
FC Yenisey Krasnoyarsk players
FC Ural Yekaterinburg players
PFC Krylia Sovetov Samara players
FC Spartak Moscow players
Russian Premier League players
Russian First League players
Russian Second League players